Fritz von Unruh (10 May 1885  – 28 November 1970) was a German expressionist dramatist, poet, and novelist.

Biography
Unruh was born in Koblenz, Germany.  A general's son, he was an officer in the German army until 1912, when he left to pursue his writing career.  Two of his earliest important works, the play Offiziere ("Officers"; 1911) and the poem Vor der Entscheidung ("Before the Decision"; 1914) established his anti-war beliefs and his belief that the social order must be based not on authority, but on the integrity and responsibility of the individual towards humanity.  Unruh's works were anti-militaristic and called for world peace and brotherhood.  Some of his more notable works include Der Opfergang ("Way of Sacrifice"), a powerful anti-war piece written during the siege of Verdun and published in 1919, Ein Geschlecht ("A Family"; 1916) and its sequel Platz (1920), and Heinrich von Andernach (1925).

Unruh was a staunch opponent of the Nazi Party and wrote several works warning of the consequences of Nazi dictatorship, including Bonaparte (1927), Berlin in Monte Carlo (1931), and Zero (1932).  He left Germany for France in 1932, later immigrating to the United States.  He finally returned to Germany in 1962 and died in the town of Dietz at age 85.

Honors and awards
1914 Kleist Prize for Louis Ferdinand Prinz von Preußen
1923 Grillparzer Prize
1947 Wilhelm Raabe Prize
1948 Goethe Prize of the City Frankfurt am Main
1955 Goethe Plaque of the City of Frankfurt
1966 Carl von Ossietzky Medal

Works

Dramas
Jürgen Wullenweber, 1908
Offiziere, 1911
Louis Ferdinand Prinz von Preußen, 1913
Ein Geschlecht, Tragödie, 1917
Platz, 1920 (Fortsetzung von Ein Geschlecht)
Stürme, Schauspiel, 1922
Rosengarten, 1923
Bonaparte, Schauspiel, 1927
Phaea, Komödie, 1930
Zero, Komödie, 1932
Gandha, 1935
Charlotte Corday, 1936
Miss Rollschuh, 1941
Der Befreiungsminister, 1948
Wilhelmus, 1953
Duell an der Havel, Schauspiel, 1954
Bismarck oder Warum steht der Soldat da?, 1955
Odysseus auf Ogygia, Schauspiel, 1968

Novels
Opfergang, 1918
Der nie verlor, 1948
Die Heilige, 1952
Fürchtet nichts, 1952
Der Sohn des Generals, 1957

Lectures
" Vaterland und Freiheit. Eine Ansprache an die deutsche Jugend",1923  
" Politeia", hrsg. von Ernst Adolf Dreyer, 1933
" Europa erwache!", gehalten am Europa-Tag in Basel, 1936
" Friede auf Erden! Peace o Earth!", Frankfurt/M., 1948
" Rede an die Deutschen", Geleitwort von Eugen Kogon, 1948
" Seid wachsam", Goethe-Rede, Frankfurt/M., 1948
" Universitätsrede", in: Was da ist. Kunst und Literatur in Frankfurt/M.,1952  
" Schillerrede", hrsg. von der Fritz von Unruh-Gesellschaft, Gießen, 1955  
" Mächtig seid ihr nicht in Waffen", Begleitwort von Albert Einstein, 1957  
" Mahnruf zum Frieden", in: Konkret 7(1961), 1960
" Wir wollen Frieden", Geleitwort von Hanns Martin Elster, 1961
" Sport und Politik", Appell an die Jugend in aller Welt, 1961
" Die Lebendigen rufe ich ", mit Beitrag von Johannes Urzidil, 1962
" Rede an die Frankfurter Jugend", hrsg. vom DGB, Kreisausschuss Frankfurt/M., 1964

Collections
Vor der Entscheidung, 1914
Flügel der Nike. Buch einer Reise, 1925
Meine Begegnungen mit Trotzki, 1963
Friede in USA? Ein Traum, 1967

External links
Fritz von Unruh Papers at Syracuse University Library
Fritz von Unruh at Encyclopædia Britannica Online
 

1885 births
1970 deaths
Writers from Koblenz
People from the Rhine Province
German untitled nobility
Republican Party of Germany politicians
German pacifists
German Expressionist writers
German Army personnel of World War I
Kleist Prize winners
German male writers